On The Front Line is the sixth studio album by American country music artist Dan Seals. It reached #12 on the Top Country Albums chart. "You Still Move Me", "I Will Be There", and "Three Time Loser" were all number one singles.

Track listing

Personnel
Adapted from liner notes.

Kathie Baillie - background vocals (track 6)
Eddie Bayers - drums (track 3)
Kenny Bell - acoustic guitar (tracks 1, 4, 5), electric rhythm guitar (track 5)
Michael Bonagura - background vocals (track 6)
Mike Brignardello - bass guitar (tracks 1, 3-6, 8, 9)
Dennis Burnside - keyboards (tracks 6, 8, 9)
Larry Byrom - electric guitar (tracks 1, 4)
Mark Casstevens - acoustic guitar (tracks 6, 9)
Bruce Dees - background vocals (track 8)
Jerry Douglas - dobro (tracks 4, 5, 9), lap steel guitar (track 6)
Steve Gibson - acoustic guitar (tracks 1, 4, 9), electric guitar (track 9), electric guitar solo (track 8)
Doyle Grisham - steel guitar (tracks 1, 3, 7, 9)
Emmylou Harris - duet vocals (track 10)
Jim Horn - saxophone (track 5)
Mark "Hoser" Hawthorne - steel guitar (tracks 2, 5)
David Hungate - bass guitar (track 2)
Greg Jennings - electric guitar (tracks 6-9)
Kirk "Jelly Roll" Johnson - harmonica (track 4)
Shane Keister - keyboards (tracks 1-3, 5, 7), synth intro (track 7)
Mike Lawler - synthesizer (tracks 1, 4, 7), da-da-dums (track 6)
Alan LeBouf - background vocals (track 6)
Kyle Lehning - LinnDrum programming (track 2)
Larrie Londin - drums (tracks 1, 4, 5, 7), LinnDrum programming (track 2)
John Porter McMeans - electric guitar (track 3)
Farrell Morris - percussion (tracks 1, 4, 8)
Mark O'Connor - fiddle (tracks 4, 9, 10), mandolin (track 10)
Mike Reid - synthesizer (track 8), background vocals (track 8)
David Schnaufer - dulcimer (track 10)
Dan Seals - lead vocals (all tracks), background vocals (all tracks except 6 & 8), acoustic guitar (tracks 2, 4), saxophone (track 5)
Lisa Silver - background vocals (tracks 5, 7, 9)
Skip Sorrell - synclavier (track 2)
Jay Spell - keyboards (tracks 1, 4, 5)
Joe Stanley - electric guitar (tracks 1, 2, 5)
James Stroud - drums (tracks 6, 8, 9)
Bobby Thompson - acoustic guitar (tracks 1, 4), electric rhythm guitar (track 5)
Diane Tidwell - background vocals (tracks 5, 7, 9)
Rafe VanHoy - acoustic guitar (tracks 3, 10)
Billy Joe Walker Jr. - electric guitar (tracks 2, 3, 5, 7)
Dennis Wilson - background vocals (tracks 5, 7, 9)
Bob Wray - bass guitar (track 7)

Chart performance

Album

Singles

References

1986 albums
Dan Seals albums
Capitol Records albums
Albums produced by Kyle Lehning